Alois Herbert Double House, also known as the Bohot Folk Art House, is a historic duplex located at St. Joseph, Missouri.  It was built in 1851, and is a -story, rectangular, Greek Revival style brick dwelling.  It has a low pitched side-gable roof with a hipped dormer.  The front facade features folk art masonry appliques added in the latter part of the 20th century.

It was listed on the National Register of Historic Places in 2007.

References

Houses on the National Register of Historic Places in Missouri
Greek Revival houses in Missouri
Houses completed in 1851
Houses in Buchanan County, Missouri
National Register of Historic Places in Buchanan County, Missouri